IRS-P2 was an Earth observation satellite launched under the National Natural Resources Management System (NNRMS) programme undertaken by Indian Space Research Organisation (ISRO). The objectives of the mission were to provide spaceborne capability to India in observing and managing natural resources and utilizing them in a productive manner.  The satellite carried imaging multi-spectral radiometers on board for radio sensing of the resources.

History 
The satellite was designed, developed and tested in just one and a half years. IRS-P2 is one of the satellites in the Indian Remote Sensing Programme of Earth Observation satellites, assembled, launched and maintained by the Indian Space Research Organisation. The satellite was controlled by ISRO Telemetry Tracking and Command Network (ISTRAC) in Bangalore, Lucknow and Mauritius. The National Remote Sensing Agency (NRSC), Hyderabad received the first signal from IRS-P2, 98 minutes after the launch. The IRS-P2 was declared operational from 7 November 1994 after certain orbital manoeuvres and started its 3-year-long observation mission. The letter "P" indicates that the satellite was to be launched aboard a Polar Satellite Launch Vehicle (PSLV).

Instrument 
IRS-P2 carried an instrument, the Linear Imaging Self-Scanning Sensor-2M (LISS-2M), two solid state push broom cameras operating using Charge-coupled device (CCD) and were capable of providing imagery in four spectral bands in the visible and near-infrared range with  resolution.

Mission 
IRS-P2 completed its mission successfully on 15 September 1997 after a duration of 3 years.

The images was marketed through a private company in the United States. The data transmitted from the satellite was gathered from National Remote Sensing Centre, Hyderabad and EOSAT, a partnership of Hughes Aircraft and RCA.

See also 

 Indian Remote Sensing

References

External links 
 ISRO IRS-P2 link 

Earth observation satellites of India
Spacecraft launched in 1994
1994 in India